David Marsh (28 December 1894 – 1960) was a British cyclist. He competed at the 1920 and the 1924 Summer Olympics. He won a gold medal in the men's amateur road race at the 1922 UCI Road World Championships, after he finished 12th in 1921.

References

External links
 

1894 births
1960 deaths
British male cyclists
Olympic cyclists of Great Britain
Cyclists at the 1920 Summer Olympics
Cyclists at the 1924 Summer Olympics
People from Poplar, London
Cyclists from Greater London
Date of death missing